Allendale Correctional Institution is a medium-security state prison for men located in Fairfax, Allendale County, South Carolina, United States, owned and operated by the South Carolina Department of Corrections.  

The facility was opened in 1989 and has a capacity of 1090 inmates held at medium security.

References

Prisons in South Carolina
Buildings and structures in Allendale County, South Carolina
1989 establishments in South Carolina